Jenny Is a Good Thing is a 1969 American short documentary film about children and poverty, directed by Joan Horvath. Produced by Project Head Start, it shows the importance of good nutrition for underprivileged nursery school children.  The film was nominated for an Academy Award for Best Documentary Short.

References

External links
Jenny Is a Good Thing on YouTube, posted by the National Archives and Records Administration

1969 films
1969 short films
1969 documentary films
American short documentary films
Documentary films about poverty in the United States
Documentary films about children
1960s short documentary films
1960s English-language films
1960s American films